Market square commonly refers to a town or city location of open air market stalls.

Market Square may also refer to:

Places

Europe

Finland
 Market Square, Hämeenlinna, Finland
 Market Square, Helsinki, Finland
 Market Square, Kuopio, Finland
 Market Square, Oulu, Finland
 Market Square, Turku, Finland

Ireland
 Market Square, Letterkenny, County Donegal

Ukraine
 Market Square (Ivano-Frankivsk)
 Market Square (Lutsk)
 Market Square (Lviv)

United Kingdom
 Old Market Square, Nottingham

North America

Canada
 Market Square, Victoria, British Columbia
Old Market Autonomous Zone, Winnipeg, Manitoba

United States
 Market Square (Lake Forest, Illinois)
 Market Square Historic District (Newburyport, Massachusetts)
 Market Square (High Point, North Carolina)
 Market Square (Miamisburg, Ohio)
 Market Square, Harrisburg, Pennsylvania
 Market Square, Pittsburgh, Pennsylvania
 Market Square, Providence, Rhode Island
 Market Square Commercial Historic District (Knoxville, Tennessee)
 Market Square (Houston, Texas)
 Main Street/Market Square Historic District, Houston, Texas
 Market Square (San Antonio), Texas
 Market Square (Alexandria, Virginia)
 Fredericksburg Town Hall and Market Square
 Centre Market Square Historic District
 Market Square, San Francisco, headquarters of Twitter

Oceania

Australia
 Market Square, Geelong, a shopping centre in Victoria, Australia

New Zealand
 Victoria Square, Christchurch (formerly named Market Square)

Other uses 
 Market Square Records, a record label

See also 
 Church Square, Pretoria, formerly Market Square
 City square (disambiguation)
 Town square (disambiguation)
 Public Square (disambiguation)
 The Square (disambiguation)
 Square (disambiguation)
 Market (disambiguation)